Indian Grove is an archaeological site consisting of a grove of 72 mature Ponderosa Pine trees located within Great Sand Dunes National Park & Preserve in Saguache County, Colorado, near Mosca, Colorado. The grove is of interest because sections of the bark of the trees were peeled off in the early 19th century, probably by Utes.

Indian Grove Back-Country Campsite, located within the grove, is one of six back-country campsites on the Sand Ramp Trail, a hiking trail that skirts the dune field on the east and north giving access to the northern portion of the National Park and Preserve along Sand Creek. The camp site hss a solar-composting toilet.

Notes

External links
Map showing the location of Indian Grove

Archaeological sites on the National Register of Historic Places in Colorado
Geography of Saguache County, Colorado
Great Sand Dunes National Park and Preserve
National Register of Historic Places in Saguache County, Colorado
National Register of Historic Places in national parks